László Csizsik Csatáry (4 March 1915 – 10 August 2013) was a Hungarian citizen and an alleged Nazi war criminal, convicted and sentenced to death in absentia in 1948 by a Czechoslovak court. In 2012, his name was added to the Simon Wiesenthal Center's list of most wanted Nazi war criminals.

Life
Csatáry was born in Mány in 1915. In 1944 he was the Royal Hungarian Police assistant to the commander in the city of Kassa in Hungary (now Košice in Slovakia). He was accused of organizing the deportation of approximately 15,700 Jews to Auschwitz and of having inhumanely exercised his authority in a forced labor camp. He was also accused of brutalizing the inhabitants of the city.

He was convicted in absentia for war crimes in Czechoslovakia in 1948 and sentenced to death. He fled to Canada in 1949, claiming to be a Yugoslav national and settled in Montreal, where he became an art dealer. He became a Canadian citizen in 1955. In 1997, his Canadian citizenship was revoked by the federal Cabinet for lying on his citizenship application. He left the country two months later but was never charged with war crimes in Canada. An extensive criminal reference check was done on him with no evidence of war crimes there.

In 2012, Csatáry was located in Budapest, Hungary, based on a tip received by the Simon Wiesenthal Center in September 2011.

His address was exposed by reporters from The Sun in July 2012. He was reportedly taken into custody on 18 July 2012 by the Hungarian authorities for questioning.

On 30 July 2012, Slovak Justice Minister Tomáš Borec announced that Slovakia was ready to prosecute against Csatáry and asked Hungary to extradite him.

A file prepared by the Simon Wiesenthal Center about Csatáry implicated him in the deportation of 300 people from Kassa in 1941. In August 2012 the Budapest Prosecutor's Office dropped the charges, saying Csatáry was not in Kassa at the time and lacked the rank to organize the transports. In January 2013 it was reported that Slovak police had found a witness to corroborate other charges relating to the deportation of 15,700 Jews from Kassa from May 1944.

Czechoslovakia had abolished capital punishment in 1990. Accordingly, on 28 March 2013, the Slovak County Court in Košice changed the 1948 verdict in Csatáry's case from death to life imprisonment.

War-crimes indictment
On 18 June 2013, Hungarian prosecutors charged Csatáry with war crimes, saying he had abused Jews and helped to deport Jews to Auschwitz during World War II. A spokesperson for the Budapest Chief Prosecutor's Office said, "He is charged with the unlawful execution and torture of people, (thus) committing war crimes partly as a perpetrator, partly as an accomplice."

The Budapest higher court suspended his case on 8 July 2013, however, because "Csatáry had already been sentenced for the crimes included in the proceedings, in former Czechoslovakia in 1948". The court also added that it was necessary to examine how the 1948 death sentence could be applied to Hungarian legal practice.

Reaction
Efraim Zuroff, director of the Simon Wiesenthal Center, said about his finding:

Yishayahu Schachar, Jewish survivor who encountered Csatáry, said:

László Karsai, a Hungarian Holocaust historian and the son of a Holocaust survivor, said:

Death
Csatáry died on 10 August 2013 from pneumonia at a hospital in Budapest, aged 98. According to daily Bors, Csatáry had been hospitalized for a long time, where he caught pneumonia.

Efraim Zuroff, director of the Simon Wiesenthal Center stated that he was "deeply disappointed" that Csatáry had died without facing trial.

See also

Operation Last Chance

References

1915 births
2013 deaths
Deaths from pneumonia in Hungary
Loss of Canadian citizenship by prior Nazi affiliation
Hungarian emigrants to Canada
Hungarian police officers convicted of crimes
Nazis convicted of war crimes
Nazis sentenced to death in absentia
Police officers convicted of murder
People from Fejér County